Oklahoma's 2nd congressional district is one of five United States congressional districts in Oklahoma and covers approximately one-fourth of the state in the east. The district borders Arkansas, Kansas, Missouri, and Texas and includes (in whole or in part) a total of 24 counties.

Historically, the district has supported conservative Democrats, and was reckoned as a classic Yellow Dog Democrat district. However, the growing Republican trend in the state has overtaken the district since the start of the 21st century. In the last two elections, the Republican presidential candidate has carried it by the largest margin in the state. Urban voters comprise a third of the district.

The district is represented by Republican Josh Brecheen, becoming only the third Republican to hold the seat since 1923. Brecheen was first elected in 2022, following the retirement of five-term Republican incumbent Markwayne Mullin, who was elected to the United States Senate.

Geography
The district borders Kansas to the north, Missouri and Arkansas to the east, and Texas (along the Red River) to the south. It covers all or part of 26 counties. It includes the remainder of Rogers County (including the county seat of Claremore) that is not included in the 1st district, and then, also, all of the following counties:  Adair, Nowata, Craig, Ottawa, Mayes, Delaware, Cherokee, Okmulgee, Muskogee, Sequoyah, Okfuskee, McIntosh, Haskell, LeFlore, Hughes, Pittsburg, Latimer, Coal, Atoka, Pushmataha, McCurtain, Choctaw, Bryan, Marshall and Johnston.

Some of the principal cities in the district include Miami, Claremore, Muskogee, Tahlequah, Okmulgee, McAlester, and Durant.

The northern half of the district includes most of the area of Oklahoma referred to as Green Country, while the southern half of the district includes a part of Oklahoma often referred to as Little Dixie. It contains the majority of lands in the Choctaw Nation and the Cherokee Nation, as well as smaller parts of the Creek and Chickasaw nations.

Demographics
According to the 2000 U.S. Census, the district is 35.51 percent urban, 23.95 percent non-white, and has a population that is 2.40 percent Latino and 1.36 percent foreign-born. The district has a higher percentage of Native Americans than any other congressional district in Oklahoma. Its representative, Josh Brecheen, is one of four Native Americans currently serving in Congress.

Recent election results in statewide races

Presidential races

Congressional races

2004

2006

2008

2010

2012

2014

2016

2018

2020

2022

Politics
In the 20th century, the district heavily favored conservative Democratic candidates, being represented in the House only by Democrats from 1923 to 1994. The district's Democratic leanings stem partly from historic migration patterns into the state– the Little Dixie region of the district imported the people and culture of southern states such as Mississippi after Reconstruction. Voter registration in Little Dixie ran as high as 90 percent Democratic in the past. Additionally, Native Americans in the region tend to vote for Democratic candidates and they have helped Democratic candidates win statewide elections.

The district first shifted Republican in electing Tom Coburn in 1994, who vacated the seat due to a self-imposed term limit pledge (he was elected to the United States Senate 4 years later). It was held by conservative Democrats Brad Carson and Dan Boren from 2001 to 2012. Since the 2012 election, the 2nd district has been safely Republican at all levels including the House: it has been represented by Markwayne Mullin since 2013. Mullin will assume office as a U.S. Senator in 2023, and will be succeeded as the Representative from the 2nd district by fellow Republican Josh Brecheen.

Presidentially, this was the best-performing district for Democrats in the 20th century; Bill Clinton was the last Democratic presidential candidate to win the district, easily carrying it in 1992 and 1996. Since then it has been safely Republican: George W. Bush received 59 percent of the vote in this district in 2004, John McCain received 66 percent of the vote in this district in 2008, and in 2020, Donald Trump won one of the highest percentages for a Republican presidential candidate, winning 76% of the vote to only 22% for the Democratic candidate Joe Biden.

Muskogee has produced six representatives, more than any other city in the district. Tahlequah has produced three representatives, the second most of any city in the district.

List of members representing the district

Historical district boundaries

See also

 Oklahoma's congressional districts
 List of United States congressional districts

References

 
 
 Congressional Biographical Directory of the United States 1774–present

02
1907 establishments in Oklahoma